Fiasco may refer to:

 a failure or humiliating situation
 Fiasco (bottle), a traditional Italian straw-covered wine bottle often associated with Chianti wine

Media 
 Fiasco (novel), a 1987 science-fiction novel by Stanisław Lem
 Fíaskó (international title: Fiasco), a 2000 Icelandic film
 Fiasco: The American Military Adventure in Iraq, a 2006 book by Thomas E. Ricks 
 Fiasco (magazine), a British fashion magazine launched in 2010
 Fiasco (TV series), American TV series launched in 2021

People with the surname
 Lupe Fiasco (born 1982), American rapper

Other uses
 Fiasco (band), a rock trio formed in Brooklyn, New York City in 2005
 Fiasco (role-playing game), a game designed to create a Coen-brothers-style story
 Fiasco, an open-source L4 microkernel family operating system developed at TU Dresden
 FIASCO, the name used by very early versions of PSPP, a free software application for analysis of sampled data
 "Fiasco!" (SpongeBob SquarePants), a 2012 episode from season 8 of SpongeBob SquarePants

See also